Super Taikyu (スーパー耐久, Super Endurance), formerly known as the Super N1 Taikyu Series prior to 2005 and N1 Endurance Series prior to 1995, and currently named the Eneos Super Taikyu Series Powered by Hankook for sponsorship reasons, is a Japanese racing series that began in 1991. In contrast to the Super GT Series, the Super Taikyu Series is a pro-am racing series for commercially available racing vehicles such as GT3, GT4, and TCR cars, and minimally-modified production vehicles mainly from the Japanese domestic market.

Super Taikyu races are held across all of Japan's major motor racing circuits, with formats including a single five-hour race, and a double-header format of two three-hour races. The series' largest event is the Fuji Super TEC 24 Hours, which is held annually at Fuji Speedway since its revival in 2018. Prior to that, the Tokachi 24 Hours was the series' largest event, held annually from 1994 until 2008.

Yokohama Rubber was the series' official tyre supplier until the end of 2017. In 2018, Pirelli became the series' new tyre supplier as part of a three-year contract. In 2021, Hankook Tire became the series' new tyre supplier. Their contract is for three years, ending in 2023, with the option to extend the contract through the end of the 2025 season. In 2022, Eneos became the new title sponsor of the series.

Classes
The series has nine classes of vehicles, ranging from FIA GT3 cars to commercially available cars with effective displacements of under 1,500 cc. GT3 cars were introduced with the introduction of the ST-X class in 2011 (named ST-GT3 from 2012 to 2013). In 2017, the series introduced the ST-Z class for GT4 cars, and the ST-TCR class for TCR touring cars (initially named ST-R for the first round of the 2017 season).

The ST-1, ST-2, ST-3, and ST-4 classes have all existed since the first year of the series in 1991, based on the original Group N regulations and with various displacement and drivetrain limits in place. A fifth production class was introduced with the addition of ST-5 in 2010.

In 2021, the ST-Q class was introduced for manufacturer-developed, non-homologated special racing vehicles, similar to Nürburgring Langstrecken Serie's SPX class. Toyota and ROOKIE Racing entered a modified Corolla Sport hatchback, equipped with a hydrogen-powered internal combustion engine, in this class beginning in 2021. In the 2021 season finale, Mazda entered a modified version of their Demio (Mazda2) subcompact, powered by biofuel. In 2022, Toyota and Subaru entered special versions of their GR86 and BRZ sports cars, adapted to run on carbon-neutral synthetic fuel. That same year, Nissan entered a "Racing Concept" version of their new Fairlady Z (RZ34) sports car, which served as the prototype for the upcoming Nissan Z GT4. Mazda introduced a new biodiesel concept, the Mazda3 Bio Concept, at the end of 2022.

Champions

ST-X/GT3 Class (2011-present) 
Bold drivers indicate a driver that was entered in every race for their respective team. Drivers listed in italics competed in a select number of rounds for their respective team.

ST-Z Class (2017-present) 
Bold drivers indicate a driver that was entered in every race for their respective team. Drivers listed in italics competed in a select number of rounds for their respective team.

ST-TCR Class (2017-present)

Incidents 
During a 2012 race at Suzuka Circuit (a support event for the 2012 FIA WTCC Race of Japan), Osamu Nakajima, driving a Nissan Fairlady Z (Z33), died after he crashed into a barrier on the first turn of the circuit.

References

External links 

Auto racing series in Japan
Group GT3
GT4 (sports car class)